The Manchurian gudgeon (Gnathopogon strigatus) is a species of ray-finned fish in the genus Gnathopogon found in the Amur drainage in Russia, China, Korea, and Mongolia.

References

Gnathopogon
Cyprinid fish of Asia
Freshwater fish of China
Fish described in 1908